Mirab Boris-ipa Kishmaria was an Abkhaz politician and army general who served as the Minister of Defence of the disputed Republic of Abkhazia from 2015 until 2020.

Early life and career
Mirab Kishmaria was born 3 August 1961 in Ochamchire in what was then the Abkhazian Autonomous Soviet Socialist Republic. In 1984 he graduated from the Alma-Ata Higher Combined Arms Command School. From June 1987 until February 1989 Kishmaria fought with the 40th division of the Soviet army in Afghanistan. During the 1992–1993 War in Abkhazia, Kishmaria was commander of the eastern front of the Abkhazian army, in the Ochamchire district.

Political career
In 2002, Kishmaria became co-chairman of the influential veteran movement Amtsakhara, together with Vladimir Nachach.

On 22 March 2005 Mirab Kishmaria was appointed First Deputy Minister of Defence. After Sultan Sosnaliyev resigned as Defence Minister on 8 May 2007, Kishmaria became acting Minister of Defence on 10 May. He was appointed permanently to the post on 26 June.

Family
Mirab Kishmaria is married to a Georgian wife, they have 11 children. Out of these, seven fought in the 1992–1993 war with Georgia, and two died therein.

Sources

References

1961 births
Abkhazian military personnel
Ministers for Defence of Abkhazia
Living people
Candidates in the 2014 Abkhazian presidential election